Juan Marcelo Casas Chamorro (born 14 April 1992) commonly referred to as Marcelo Casas is a Paraguayan-Spanish footballer who currently plays for Guaraní F.B.C. in the Paraguayan Division Intermedia.

Career

Panathinaikos
On 10 December 2010, it was reported that Casas' former youth club, Primera División Paraguaya team Libertad would sue Panathinaikos for breach of trust. Casas travelled to Greece in 2009 to trial with Panathinaikos after Libertad received an invitation from Panathinaikos to trial the player for 30 days. According to Libertad, Panathinaikos asked Libertad for a one-month extension as the player was passing the trials. In that time, Panathinaikos convinced Casas to continue at the club without Libertad's permission, using the invitation as a trick, and the player signed for the club when he turned 18 years old. Libertad detailed that the club deserved expenses due to forming the player:

"We brought him from the interior, we looked after him, we gave him food, we gave him home health, we formed him for four years to become a Libertad player and he is taken. It is a similar case to Juan Iturbe".

The player signed with the club on a Spanish passport, and was team mates with Greece under-21 player Giorgos Machlelis and Australia under-20 player Robert Stambolziev.

22 de Septiembre
Casas featured for 22 de Septiembre during the 2015 Primera División B Nacional. In October 2015, he featured during the promotion play-offs against Liga Ovetense as the latter eventually gained promotion to the 2016 División Intermedia. Subsequently, 22 de Septiembre were then forced to play a promotion play off against the runner-up of the Primera División B Metropolitana in order to ascend to the 2016 División Intermedia. In November 2015, Casas featured in both fixtures of the play-off against Club Fulgencio Yegros as 22 de Septiembre were defeated 4−2 on penalties after a 2−2 aggregate score.

Fulgencio Yegros
Casas made his first appearance for the club in Round 1 of the 2016 División Intermedia, playing a full 90 minutes of a 3−2 away victory against Ovetense. He then played a full 90 minutes in a 4−0 thrashing against Sport Colombia the following week. He would not play again until round 7 in a 1−0 away defeat against Sportivo Iteño. On 10 July 2016, he scores for the club in a 1−1 draw vs Ovetense.

22 de Septiembre
Casas rejoined Club 22 de Septiembre in 2017 as they were promoted to the División Intermedia having won a promotion play off, the same promotion play off that the player had played in during 2015.

Athletic FBC
In 2019, Casas played for Encarnación team Athletic FBC in Paraguay's third-tier.

Guaraní FBC
In June 2021, Casas played in a 3–0 away victory against Sportivo Ameliano. In August 2021, he played in a 1–0 victory against General Díaz. In September 2021, he scored in the first goal in 30th minute of a 2–1 home victory against Sportivo Iteño. In September 2021, he played in a 2–0 away defeat against General Caballero JLM.

Honours

Club
 Panathinaikos:
 Superleague Greece: Runners-up: 1
 2010–11
 22 de Septiembre
 Primera División B Nacional: Runners-up: 1
 2015

References

External links

 
 

1992 births
Living people
Club Fulgencio Yegros players
Association football midfielders
Paraguayan footballers